Dave "Davey" Hilton Jr. (born December 9, 1963) is a Canadian former boxing world champion. He is the older brother of former light middleweight world champion of boxing, Matthew Hilton.

Professional boxing career
He briefly held the WBC super middleweight title after defeating Dingaan Thobela in December 2000, but shortly thereafter, the WBC stripped it from him after child molestation charges were leveled against him.  Hilton suffered only two losses in his career, to fellow Canadians Stephane Ouellet, and Alain Bonnamie.  He later avenged the loss to Bonnamie, and has previously knocked out Ouellet twice.

Professional boxing record

Legal troubles

Hilton was found guilty in 2001 of sexually abusing his daughters, Jeannie, born in 1981, and Anne Marie, born in 1983, between 1995 and 1998, and was sentenced to seven years in jail in a facility 110 kilometers northwest of Montreal. In May 2006, Hilton was granted parole and was freed on June 20. He made his return to the boxing ring in May 2007 and won a unanimous decision. Hilton's daughters have written a book, Le Coeur au beurre noir (The Heart with a Black Eye), describing their abuse in detail. In September 2004, a Quebec judge lifted a publication ban on the identities of the daughters so they could publish the book. An English translation is in progress.

On August 20, 2007, Hilton was arrested by police and returned to jail for breaching conditions of his release. It was reported that Hilton assaulted his wife and made threats. He was acquitted on the charges of assault and death threats but remained detained pending the decision of Commission nationale des libérations conditionnelles due to his conditional release violations.

Dave Hilton was again arrested on September 28, 2010, and charged with threats and assault, along with his brother, Jimmy Hilton.

Hilton remarried in September 2012, and had another daughter in March 2013.

See also
List of world super-middleweight boxing champions
List of boxing families

References

External links

 

|-

1963 births
Living people
Canadian male boxers
Sportspeople from Mississauga
Sportspeople convicted of crimes
Canadian people convicted of child sexual abuse
Publication bans in Canadian case law
World Boxing Council champions
World super-middleweight boxing champions